The Old Capitol Mall (now Old Capitol Town Center) is a shopping mall in the downtown area of Iowa City, Iowa. Located across the street from the south-east corner of the Pentacrest (a four-block-sized parcel of land with a collection of five buildings with the old Iowa Territory capitol in the middle), the Old Capitol Mall was a convenient shopping center for University of Iowa students, faculty, and staff. It was originally anchored by JCPenney and Younkers, and over 70 stores. In July 1998, JCPenney and other stores moved to larger Coral Ridge Mall and divided into smaller stores. In 2004, Younkers closed.

The Mall saw decreasing traffic after the opening of the Coral Ridge Mall in the adjacent town of Coralville, Iowa. Many major retailers opted to focus on their Coral Ridge locations and close their low-performing Old Capitol locations. While some stores and restaurants still exist in the Old Capitol Mall, other spaces have been used by newspaper offices, the University of Iowa, or various political parties. The University of Iowa has largely taken over this building.

References

External links
 Old Capitol Mall entry at Deadmalls.com

Shopping malls in Iowa
Buildings and structures in Iowa City, Iowa
Shopping malls established in 1981
1981 establishments in Iowa